Jules Bastin (18 August 1933 – 2 December 1996, in Waterloo) was a Belgian operatic bass. He appeared at major opera houses throughout Europe, including the Royal Opera House, La Scala, and the Palais Garnier; he also sang at opera houses in North and South America. He was known for playing roles from a variety of operatic traditions, from Monteverdi to Berg, but he was perhaps most famous for singing the comic role of Ochs in Richard Strauss's Der Rosenkavalier.

The New York Times reported: " Mr. Bastin sang the starring bass roles in Verdi's Don Carlo and in operas by Mozart, Wagner and other composers. Although best known for his sensitive interpretation of works in French and Italian, his favorite role was that of Baron Ochs in Der Rosenkavalier ".

He began his career as a teacher of German, French and history before turning to professional singing. After becoming successful in opera, he continued to teach music at the Royal Music Conservatory in Brussels. He had the same teacher  as José Van Dam.

See also
 Charpentier: Mors Saülis et Jonathae H.403 (Louis Devos recording 1981)
Massenet: Cendrillon (Julius Rudel recording)
 Mozart: Così fan tutte (Alain Lombard recording)
 Mozart: Le nozze di Figaro (Herbert von Karajan recording)
 Strauss: Der Rosenkavalier (Edo de Waart recording)

References

Biografie in Cent Wallons du siècle, Institut Jules Destrée, Charleroi, 1995

1933 births
1996 deaths
20th-century Belgian male opera singers
Operatic basses
People from Liège Province